Laguna Verde, the Spanish-language form of green lagoon or green lake, may refer to:

Bolivia
Laguna Verde (Bolivia), a salt lake in Potosi Department
Laguna Verde (Beni), a lake in Beni Department
Laguna Verde (Comarapa), a lake in Comarapa

Chile
Laguna Verde, Chile, a town
Laguna Verde (lake of Chile), in the Andes
Laguna Verde (volcano), in the Salar de Atacama

Other places
Laguna Verde (Hong Kong), a residential complex in Kowloon, Hong Kong, China
Laguna Verde Nuclear Power Station, in Alto Lucero, Veracruz, Mexico

See also
Green Lake (disambiguation)
Lago Verde (disambiguation)